Ikki (written: 一輝, 一樹 or 一騎) is a masculine Japanese given name. Notable people with the name include:

, Japanese writer and film producer
, Japanese intellectual
, Japanese footballer
, Japanese model and actor
, Japanese baseball player

Fictional characters
Ikki, a character from the animated television series The Legend of Korra
, protagonist of the light novel series Chivalry of a Failed Knight
, a character in the Medabots franchise
Ikki Igarashi, one of the main characters in Kamen Rider Revice

Japanese masculine given names